At Our Worst is a b-sides/live album released by American melodic hardcore band Evergreen Terrace. The band wrote this in their CD:
"Well here it is. Another album of no new songs. Seems like as things progress for us touring wise, things get worse and worse on the time we have to do other things, like write a new album! The idea for this album came along to us by another label named Indianola. They wanted to release our demos and whatnot, and we laughed. We wanted nothing to do with an album like this. In a way we still don't, but hey... money talks and we could really use some new equipment. These live tracks were taken from a show in Jacksonville, FL @ Jack Rabbits November 2003. The unreleased track was originally written for Burned Alive By Time, but for whatever reason didn't make it to the cd. As for the demo songs on here, please be nice to us, they suck. We were in a band for two months when we wrote this. When we first put it out we were selling our demos in sandwich bags, a long way we have come. Anyways... while you guys sit back and listen to this album, we'll be sitting in our log cabin on the lake tahoe writing for our next album. We promise not to disappoint! Regardless, thanks to everyone who supports us by buying these albums to hold them over 'till the next real full length. Cheers, Evergreen Terrace."

Track listing

"No Donnie, These Men Are Nihilists" and "You're Entering a World of Pain" are quotes from the Coen Brothers film The Big Lebowski. Both are said by John Goodman.
"You're Entering a World of Pain" is released as "Burned Alive by Time" on the album of the same name.

Production
Tracks 1-5 Recorded in Jacksonville, FL @ Jack Rabbits NOV. 2003 Engineered and Mixed by: Lee Dyess & Jason Southwell
Track 6 Recorded @ Earthsound Studios JULY 2002 by: Lee Dyess and Vision Studios APRIL 2004 by:Daryl Phenniger
Tracks 7-10 Recorded @ Hole Of The Pigeon Studios FEB. 2000 Engineered and Mixed by: Paul Lapinski

Cultural references
The band is known for referring to pop culture in their titles, lyrics, and soundbites.

References

Evergreen Terrace albums
2004 albums